Omophron ovale, the oval round sand beetle, is a species of ground beetle in the family Carabidae. It is found in North America. Inhabiting mostly the margins of freshwater ponds, streams, and lakes (as well as some sea beaches and salt marshes), O. ovale are riparian and burrow into sand and mud. O. ovale, as all Carabidae, go through complete metamorphosis. This consists of three distinct stages before becoming an adult— egg, then larva, then pupa. O. ovale are around 4.5mm to 6.6mm in length and have a distinctive pattern on their body, with yellowish tan and metallic green markings.

References

Further reading

 
 

Carabidae
Articles created by Qbugbot
Beetles described in 1870